The Brown Bears men's soccer team represents Brown University in men's Division I NCAA competitions. They compete in the Ivy League. The Bears have been semifinalists in the NCAA tournament in 1968, 1973, and 1975. They also finished in fourth place in 1977. They are coached by Patrick Laughlin who has been head coach since 2010.

Roster

Notable alumni 

 Ben Brewster
 Chris Fox
 Cory Gibbs
 Jeff Larentowicz
 Thomas McNamara
 Fred Pereira
 Steve Ralbovsky
 Dylan Remick

See also 
 Brown Bears

References

External links 
 

 
Brown University
1926 establishments in Rhode Island
Association football clubs established in 1926